Emanuel Raúl Bocchino (born 9 March 1988) is an Argentine professional footballer who plays as a centre-back for Spanish club Vélez CF.

Career
Independiente were the first team of Bocchino's senior career, with the defender making his sole appearance for the club on 14 December 2008 as Independiente lost to Arsenal de Sarandí in the Primera División. 2009 saw Bocchino join Quilmes, though left months later without featuring to sign for Huracán in Torneo Argentino B. After one goal in nineteen fixtures for Huracán, Bocchino completed further moves to Racing de Olavarría and Alvarado between 2011 and 2013. Bocchino was signed by Torneo Argentino A's Central Córdoba on 2 July 2013. Forty-four games and one goal later, in 2014, they won promotion to tier two.

After twenty-nine appearances in the second tier, Bocchino switched Central Córdoba for Brown in January 2016. Six months later, in June, Bocchino left his homeland for the first time to play for Bolivian Primera División side Blooming. He made his debut against Jorge Wilstermann on 14 August, prior to netting his opening goal versus San José in September. More goals came in matches with Sport Boys and Real Potosí as he made forty league appearances, as well as four in the Copa Sudamericana. Bocchino went to Primera B Metropolitana's Platense in 2017. His first season culminated with promotion as champions.

In June 2019, Bocchino headed off to Cypriot Second Division club Alki Oroklini. He made his debut on 4 October during a victory over Aris Limassol, which preceded a further sixteen appearances in all competitions in 2019–20. In September 2020, Bocchino was signed by Spanish Tercera División team Vélez.

Career statistics
.

Honours
Platense
Primera B Metropolitana: 2017–18

References

External links

1988 births
Living people
People from Caseros Department
Argentine footballers
Association football defenders
Argentine expatriate footballers
Expatriate footballers in Bolivia
Expatriate footballers in Cyprus
Expatriate footballers in Spain
Argentine expatriate sportspeople in Bolivia
Argentine expatriate sportspeople in Cyprus
Argentine expatriate sportspeople in Spain
Argentine Primera División players
Primera Nacional players
Torneo Argentino B players
Torneo Argentino A players
Torneo Federal A players
Primera B Metropolitana players
Bolivian Primera División players
Cypriot Second Division players
Tercera División players
Club Atlético Independiente footballers
Quilmes Atlético Club footballers
Huracán de Comodoro Rivadavia footballers
Racing de Olavarría footballers
Club Atlético Alvarado players
Central Córdoba de Santiago del Estero footballers
Club Atlético Brown footballers
Club Blooming players
Club Atlético Platense footballers
Alki Oroklini players
Vélez CF players
Sportspeople from Santa Fe Province